Femi Adebayo Salami  (born 31 December 1978) is a Nigerian film director, film actor, lawyer, producer and Special Adviser to the Governor of Kwara State on Arts, Culture and Tourism. He is the son of the veteran actor Adebayo Salami.

Early life 
Adebayo was born on 31 December; 1978 in Lagos, southwest Nigeria. His father, who is a veteran Nigerian actor Adebayo Salami (Oga Bello), hails from Ilorin, Kwara State.

Education 
Adebayo attended the C&S College, Ilorin, Kwara State. for his secondary school education. He then went to the University of Ilorin, where he obtained a bachelor's degree in Law. He later earned a master's degree in Law at the University of Ibadan.

Personal life 
Adebayo married Omotayo Adebayo on 9 October 2016. Adebayo and his wife have one son. He also has three children from an earlier marriage.

Career 
Adebayo began acting in 1985, the same year he featured in his father's first movie titled Ogun Ajaye.

Adebayo has starred in over 500 Nigerian films, winning four awards as Best Yoruba actor at the 17th African Film Awards popularly known as Afro Hollywood awards at the Stratford Town Hall in London. He also won an award in the same category for the Best of Nollywood Broadcasting Organization of Nigeria Awards in 2012.
Adebayo has a long list of movies to his credits, which includes the Sonto Alapata, Wura Ati Fadaka, Ma Wobadan and Buga, among others. He is the MD/CEO of J-15 media network Nigeria.

Adebayo signed a deal with a digital TV platform, StarTimes as her ambassador.

In 2022 Femi Adebayo was nominated for Best Actor in A Comedy (AMVCA)

In July 2022, he was named as the ambassador for Kubanah whisky along with some other Nollywood actors

Awards and honours

Filmography 
 Owo Blow (1995)
Apaadi (2009)
 Ayitale (2013)
 October 1 (2014)
 Shola Arikusa (2017)
 Heaven on My Mind (2018)
The Ghost and the Tout (2018)
 Mokalik (2019)
Mama Drama (2020)
Unroyal (2020)
The Miracle Centre (2020)
Charge and Bail (2021)
Progressive Tailors Club (2021)
Love Castle (2021)
King of Thieves (2022 film) (2022)
Diamonds in the Sky (2019)
Jelili (2011)
Survival of Jelili (2019)
The Ghost and the Tout (2018)
Charge and Bail (2021)
Jumbled (2019)
The Island (2018)
Special Jollof (2020)
1 October (2014)

See also 
 List of Nigerian actors

References

External links 
 
 
 

Living people
Yoruba male actors
Nigerian male film actors
Male actors from Lagos
Male actors in Yoruba cinema
University of Ilorin alumni
20th-century Nigerian male actors
21st-century Nigerian male actors
University of Ibadan alumni
Nigerian film directors
Nigerian media personalities
1978 births